Berag (also Romanized as Berāg) is a village in Piveshk Rural District, Lirdaf District, Jask County, Hormozgan Province, Iran. At the 2006 census, its population was 259, in 60 families.

References 

Populated places in Jask County